St. Sofroniy Knoll (‘Sv. Sofronieva Mogila’ \ sve-'ti so-'fro-ni-e-va mo-'gi-la\) is the hill rising to 107 m on the small ice-free peninsula of President Head in the northeast extremity of Snow Island in the South Shetland Islands, Antarctica. It is situated 1.3 km southwest of the extreme northeast point of the peninsula, and overlooks Calliope Beach on the west-northwest and Oeagrus Beach on the west.

The knoll is named after St. Sofroniy Vrachanski (Sophronius of Vratsa, born Stoyko Vladislavov; 1739–1813), a leading figure in the Bulgarian National Revival.

Location
British mapping in 1968, Bulgarian in 2009.

Map
 L.L. Ivanov. Antarctica: Livingston Island and Greenwich, Robert, Snow and Smith Islands. Scale 1:120000 topographic map.  Troyan: Manfred Wörner Foundation, 2009.

References
 St. Sofroniy Knoll. SCAR Composite Gazetteer of Antarctica.
 Bulgarian Antarctic Gazetteer. Antarctic Place-names Commission. (details in Bulgarian, basic data in English)

External links
 St. Sofroniy Knoll. Copernix satellite image

Hills of the South Shetland Islands
Bulgaria and the Antarctic